Equastone is a real estate investment advisor company, headquartered in San Diego, California.

Equastone owns the following skyscrapers:

Equitable Building in Atlanta, Georgia
Pan American Life Center in New Orleans, Louisiana
One Riverwalk Place in San Antonio, Texas

It also owns several other high-rise and smaller office buildings in Texas, Colorado, Arizona, Nevada, California, and Oregon.

, the Equitable Building is in foreclosure, a month after its River Place Corporate Park office complex in Austin, Texas did the same.

References

External links
 Equastone on Bloomberg
Companies based in San Diego